Bayenghem-lès-Seninghem (literally Bayenghem near Seninghem) is a commune in the Pas-de-Calais department in the Hauts-de-France region in northern France.

Geography
A village located 10 miles (16 km) southwest of Saint-Omer, on the D204 road, just off the N42.

Population

Sights
 St. Martin's sixteenth-century church.

See also
Communes of the Pas-de-Calais department

References

Communes of Pas-de-Calais